Agnese Grigio (born 12 January 1963) is a visually impaired Italian Paralympic athlete. She won a silver medal and bronze medal.

Career 
She continued as a pentathlete, and middle distance runner. She competed at the 1984 Summer Paralympic Games in New York, winning a bronze medal in the 800 meters B3, and a silver medal in the Pentathlon B3.

For personal reasons, she soon interrupted her athletic career, continuing to practise torball (a discipline not present in the Paralympics), at national and international levels.

She is the sister of Emanuela Grigio.

References 

Living people
1963 births
Paralympic athletes of Italy
Italian female discus throwers
Italian female middle-distance runners
Italian pentathletes
Athletes (track and field) at the 1984 Summer Paralympics
Medalists at the 1984 Summer Paralympics
Paralympic middle-distance runners
Paralympic discus throwers
Visually impaired middle-distance runners
Visually impaired discus throwers
Paralympic silver medalists for Italy
Paralympic bronze medalists for Italy